There were 121 Empire ships that had a suffix beginning with T. They can be found at

 List of Empire ships - Ta to Te
 List of Empire ships - Th to Ty

Lists of Empire ships